Several ships of the British Royal Navy have been named HMS Charlestown

In November 1781, the ship fell in with the privateer Thorn. She remained in the Royal Navy until sold in 1783.
 , a Town-class destroyer received from the US Navy in 1940 and decommissioned in 1945.

Citations

References
 Demerliac, Alain (1996) La Marine De Louis XVI: Nomenclature Des Navires Français De 1774 À 1792. (Nice: Éditions OMEGA). 

Royal Navy ship names